Mahboub Juma'a Mahboub Mubarak (born 17 September 1955) is a Kuwaiti football defender who played for Kuwait in the 1982 FIFA World Cup. He also played for Al-Salmiya SC.

See also 
 List of men's footballers with 100 or more international caps

References

External links
 International Caps on the RSSSF
 FIFA profile

1955 births
Kuwaiti footballers
Kuwait international footballers
Association football defenders
Al Salmiya SC players
Olympic footballers of Kuwait
Footballers at the 1980 Summer Olympics
1982 FIFA World Cup players
Living people
1976 AFC Asian Cup players
1980 AFC Asian Cup players
1984 AFC Asian Cup players
1988 AFC Asian Cup players
AFC Asian Cup-winning players
Asian Games medalists in football
Footballers at the 1982 Asian Games
Asian Games silver medalists for Kuwait
FIFA Century Club
Medalists at the 1982 Asian Games
Kuwait Premier League players